William Hope may refer to:

William Hope (VC) (1834–1909), Scottish recipient of the Victoria Cross
William Hope (paranormal investigator) (1863–1933), pioneer of so-called "spirit photography"
William Hope (actor) (born 1955), Canadian actor
William Johnstone Hope (1766–1831), prominent and controversial British Royal Navy officer and politician
William Henry Bateman Hope (1865–1919), British Member of Parliament for North Somerset, 1906–1910
William Hope Hodgson (1877–1918), English author of horror, fantastic fiction and science fiction
William Hope (artist) (1863–1931), Canadian painter, draftsman and war artist
Sir William Hope, 14th Baronet (1819–1898), British Army officer